The 2019 Watford Borough Council election took place on 2 May 2019 to elect members of Watford Borough Council in England. This was the same day as other local elections.

Summary

Result

Ward Results

Callowland

Central

Holywell

Leggatts

Meriden

Nascot

Oxhey

Park

Stanborough

Tudor

Vicarage

Woodside

References

2019 English local elections
2019
2010s in Hertfordshire
May 2019 events in the United Kingdom